Hill Park Secondary School was the oldest high school on the Hamilton Mountain and was a member of the Hamilton-Wentworth District School Board. The school, located at 465 East 16th Street in Hamilton, was founded in 1955 as a fully composite high school, and was the first secondary school built on the Hamilton Mountain. The school was built as part of Hamilton's need for more secondary schools to match the increasing enrollment of baby boomers. The HWDSB announced on 24 May 2012 that Hill Park Secondary School will close, along with Barton Secondary School and Mountain Secondary School. The students will be consolidated into a new, $25 million school, to be named Nora Frances Henderson Secondary School. The school closed in June 2014 and the students from the school moved over to the former Barton Secondary School, renamed to Nora Frances Henderson as a backup until the newer school is opened.

Program Highlights
 Boys Athletic Council – Hamilton Bulldogs game event, holiday dinner, Toronto Raptors game event
 Drama – Program of Choice in the Performing Arts, and Specialist High Skills Major in Arts and Culture, which allow students to complete their diploma with a focus in the arts.  Art Smart is an innovative program that allows students from across Hamilton, Ontario to participate in a musical theatre production, co-produced by partners at Theatre Ancaster. Trips to Stratford, Toronto, and Theatre Aquarius. For the first time, the club will compete in the 64th season of Ontario Sears Drama Festival
 Geography – Trips to Niagara Falls, Toronto, Royal Botanical Gardens, waterfront
 Hamilton Music Awards
 History and English – Trips to New York City
 Media Arts – Film festival
 Phys-Ed – Camping and ski trips

Student Support Programs
 After School Literacy Program
 Bursary Program
 Complete-A-Credit
 Credit Recovery
 Grade 6-8 Transitions Program
 Jr. and Sr. Alter Ed.
 Ontario Secondary School Literacy Course (OSSLC)
 SMART Club
 STEP program (remedial summer)
 Walk-In Closet Program

Drive to 85
Drive to 85 is a program that gives students more ways to accumulate credits to graduate while improving the quality of high school education in the province. The program's aim is for 85% of Ontario students to graduate from secondary school by the 2010-2011 school year.

Clubs & Sports
Hill Park Secondary School has the following clubs and sports:
 Anime Club
 Archery Club 
 Art Council
 Athletic Council (Boys, Girls)
 Badminton
 Baseball
 Basketball (Girls, Boys Jr., Mid., Sr.)
 Cross Country
 Dance Ensemble
 Field Hockey
 Football (Boys Jr./Sr.)
 Golf
 Hill Park Outers Club
 Hockey (Boys, Girls)
 Indoor Track
 Martial Arts Self-Defense
 Music Council (Vocal Ensemble, Repertoire)
 Rowing
 Rugby
 Slo-Pitch (Girls)
 SMART Club
 Soccer (Boys, Girls)
 Student Council
 Tennis
 Touch Football (Gr. 9, Girls, Sr. Boys)
 Track and Field
 Volleyball (Co-Ed, Girls, Jr./Sr. Boys)
 Water Polo (Girls, Jr./Sr. Boys)
 Weight Training

Notable alumni
 Jason Jones (born 1973), actor and comedian (The Detour, The Daily Show with Jon Stewart)
 Wolodumir “Walter” Stadnick, (born 1952), national president of the Hells Angels.

See also
List of high schools in Ontario

References

High schools in Hamilton, Ontario
Educational institutions established in 1955
Educational institutions disestablished in 2014
1955 establishments in Ontario
2014 disestablishments in Ontario